Thomas Vyvyan was an Oxford college head in the 16th-century.

he was a Fellow of Exeter College, Oxford, from 1511 to 1518. He became Vicar of Bodmin in 1516. he was Rector of Exeter College, Oxford, from 27 March 1518 – 8 October 1519.

References

Rectors of Exeter College, Oxford
16th-century English people